Debeli lag (Bulgarian: Дебели лаг) is a village in western Bulgaria. Its located in Oblast Pernik, Obshtina Radomir.

Geography 
It is located near the Pchelina dam. The village also has a railway station.

Landmarks 

 St. Petka-Paraskeva Church, built in 1876 in memory of Vasil Levski, who was a frequent guest at the home of Atanas Doninski, a resident of the village.
 The Church of St. Peter and Paul, built by the Ampevi kin, has an unseen iconostasis, painted icons on all walls, three bells on the bell tower, and its courtyard with unique trees.
 Monument to those who fell during the wars of 1912-1913 and 1915-1918 and during the Second World War.

Notable people 

 Ljuben Brusev (1929 - 2007), Bulgarian athlete, coach and judge in classical wrestling

References 

 www.grao.bg

Villages in Pernik Province